The organic compound citrulline is an α-amino acid. Its name is derived from citrullus, the Latin word for watermelon. Although named and described by gastroenterologists since the late 19th century, it was first isolated from watermelon in 1914 by Japanese researchers Yotaro Koga and Ryo Odake and further codified by Mitsunori Wada of Tokyo Imperial University in 1930.
It has the formula H2NC(O)NH(CH2)3CH(NH2)CO2H.  It is a key intermediate in the urea cycle, the pathway by which mammals excrete ammonia by converting it into urea. Citrulline is also produced as a byproduct of the enzymatic production of nitric oxide from the amino acid arginine, catalyzed by nitric oxide synthase.

Biosynthesis
Citrulline can be derived from:
 from arginine via nitric oxide synthase, as a byproduct of the production of nitric oxide for signaling purposes
 from ornithine through the breakdown of proline or glutamine/glutamate
 from asymmetric dimethylarginine via DDAH

Citrulline is made from ornithine and carbamoyl phosphate in one of the central reactions in the urea cycle. It is also produced from arginine as a byproduct of the reaction catalyzed by NOS family (NOS; EC 1.14.13.39). It is also prevalent in trichohyalin at the inner root sheath and medulla of hair follicles, where it is synthesized from arginine. Arginine is first oxidized into N-hydroxyl-arginine, which is then further oxidized to citrulline concomitant with release of nitric oxide.

Citrulline is also made by enterocytes of the small intestine.

Function
Several proteins contain citrulline as a result of a post-translational modification. These citrulline residues are generated by a family of enzymes called peptidylarginine deiminases (PADs), which convert arginine into citrulline in a process called citrullination or deimination with the help of calcium ions. Proteins that normally contain citrulline residues include myelin basic protein (MBP), filaggrin, and several histone proteins, whereas other proteins, such as fibrin and vimentin are susceptible to citrullination during cell death and tissue inflammation.

Circulating citrulline concentration is a biomarker of intestinal functionality.

See also
 Citrullinemia

Notes

References

Amino acids
Ureas
Urea cycle
Non-proteinogenic amino acids
Biomarkers